The Brădeşti gas field is a natural gas field located in Brădeşti, Harghita County. It was discovered in 1965 and developed by Romgaz. It began production in 1966 and produces natural gas and condensates. The total proven reserves of the Brădeşti gas field are around 74 billion cubic feet (2.1 km³), and production is centered on 20 million cubic feet/day (0.57×105m³).

References

Natural gas fields in Romania